Tir Bazar (also Romanized as Tīr Bāzār; also known as Tīr Bāzār Bāla and Tīr Bāzān) is a village in Koregah-e Gharbi Rural District, in the Central District of Khorramabad County, Lorestan Province, Iran. At the 2006 census, its population was 648, in 130 families.

References 

Towns and villages in Khorramabad County